Katherine Nicole Stengel (born February 29, 1992) is an American soccer player who plays for Liverpool of the Barclays Women's Super League.

She previously played for the Boston Breakers, Washington Spirit, the Utah Royals and the Houston Dash in the NWSL. Bayern Munich in Germany and both Western Sydney Wanderers and Newcastle Jets in the Australian W-League.

In 2012, she was part of the United States Under-20 team that won the 2012 CONCACAF Women's U-20 Championship and the 2012 FIFA U-20 Women's World Cup.

Early life
Stengel attended Viera High School in Viera, Florida. She attended Wake Forest University from 2010 to 2013 where she played for the Demon Deacons women's soccer team. Stengel completed her college career as the highest scoring player in Wake Forest history with 50 goals in 75 games, and she was a four-time All-ACC honoree and a three-time All-America, becoming in 2011 the first Wake Forest player to be named first-team All America.

Club career

Bayern Munich, 2014–2015
In January 2014, Stengel skipped the 2014 NWSL College Draft and instead joined the Los Angeles Blues of the since-disbanded USL W-League. In June 2014, Stengel joined Frauen-Bundesliga side Bayern Munich. She helped Bayern win the 2014–15 Frauen Bundesliga title, leading the team with nine goals.

Washington Spirit, 2016–2017
In December 2015, Stengel signed with the Washington Spirit. In her first season with the team, she played in 19 regular season matches, starting 10, totaling 928 minutes. Stengel contributed four goals during the season, tied for second most on the team. In 2016 Washington advanced to the NWSL Championship Game. The game was tied 2-2 after extra time and went to penalties. Stengal converted her penalty, but Washington lost to the Western New York Flash 3–2 on penalties.

Stengel appeared in five games for the Spirit in 2017 before she was released by the club on June 28, 2017.

Loan to Western Sydney Wanderers
Stengel was signed by Australian team Western Sydney Wanderers ahead of the 2016–17 W-League season. She was the leading goal-scorer for the Wanderers with six goals for the season.

Boston Breakers, 2017
The day after her release by the Washington Spirit, Stengel was selected off waivers by the Boston Breakers. She appeared in 12 games for the Breakers in 2017.

Loan to Newcastle Jets
In October 2017, Stengel returned to Australia, joining Newcastle Jets for the 2017–18 W-League season. Stengel scored 10 goals for the Jets and finished second in the Golden Boot race behind Sam Kerr. Newcastle finished in third place and returned to the Finals series for the first time since the 2008-09 season.

Stengel returned to Newcastle for the 2018–19 W-League season.

Utah Royals, 2018–2019
After the Boston Breakers folded ahead of the 2018 season, Stengel was selected by the Utah Royals FC in the Boston Breakers dispersal draft. Stengel appeared in 23 games for the Royals. She scored a team leading six goals and scored the first brace in Royals history.

Stengel returned to the Royals for the 2019 season. She appeared in all 24 games and scored 2 goals.

Houston Dash, 2020–2022
On January 8, 2020, the Utah Royals traded Stengel and a third round pick in the 2020 NWSL College Draft to the Houston Dash in exchange for their second round picks in the 2020 and 2021 College drafts. She was waived by the club in May 2021.

Liverpool Football Club, 2022–present
On January 6, 2022, Liverpool Football Club signed Stengel, reuniting her with manager Matt Beard. Stengel had played for Beard previously at Boston Breakers. Stengel will wear the jersey number 24 and play in the number 9 role as a striker on the second-division team.

International career
With the United States Under-20 team Stengel won the 2012 CONCACAF Women's U-20 Championship. At the 2012 FIFA U-20 Women's World Cup Stengel appeared in four games and scored three goals. The United States won the U-20 World Cup.

Stengel has also played for the United States U-23 women's national team. In March 2014, she received her first full national team call-up from head coach Tom Sermanni. Stengel has not yet been capped by the USWNT.

Personal life
Stengel's younger sister Jackie played for North Carolina State University and her father Scott played for the Air Force Academy.

Honors

International
 CONCACAF U20 Women's Championship: 2012
 FIFA U20 Women's World Cup: 2012

Club
FC Bayern Munich
 Frauen-Bundesliga Champions: 2014–15

References

External links

 
 Boston Breakers profile
 US Soccer profile
 Bayern profile 
 Wake Forest profile 
 

Living people
American women's soccer players
Soccer players from Florida
American expatriate soccer players in Germany
People from Melbourne, Florida
Viera High School alumni
Wake Forest Demon Deacons women's soccer players
Pali Blues players
FC Bayern Munich (women) players
1992 births
Women's association football forwards
Washington Spirit players
Western Sydney Wanderers FC (A-League Women) players
Newcastle Jets FC (A-League Women) players
National Women's Soccer League players
A-League Women players
Expatriate women's soccer players in Australia
United States women's under-20 international soccer players
Boston Breakers players
Utah Royals FC players
Houston Dash players
American expatriate sportspeople in Australia
American expatriate women's soccer players
Liverpool F.C. Women players
Expatriate women's footballers in England
Women's Championship (England) players
American expatriate sportspeople in England